The Imposter is the second full-length album by American singer-songwriter Kevin Max and was released on October 11, 2005 on Northern Records. The title and overall themes of the album draw inspiration from the writings of theologian (and friend of Max's) Brennan Manning, particularly Manning's books Ragamuffin Gospel and Abba's Child. The title track, according to Max, concerns "the fight between the flesh and the spirit."

The Imposter'''s musical textures are different from those found on Stereotype Be. Gone are the Middle Eastern musical influences in favor of a mixture of ballads and faster rock songs with more pronounced classic rock and blues influences. The album's lyrics are also more straightforward than those on Stereotype Be and, perhaps in keeping with a simpler feel, no spoken-word segments are on The Imposter, although there is a reading that opens "Fade to Red."

Songs from The Imposter album were used in a movie Kevin Max starred in also called The Imposter (2008 film).''  The songs used were "The Imposter," "Sanctuary," "Your Beautiful Mind," and "The Imposter's Song."

Track listing

Personnel 
 Kevin Max – vocals
 Byron Hagen – keyboards, acoustic piano, programming 
 Andrew D. Prickett – keyboards, programming, guitars 
 Erick Cole – guitars
 Elijah Thomson – bass 
 Aaron Sterling – drums
 Frank Lenz – drums, string arrangements
 Holly Nelson – backing vocals

Production 
 Jeff Anderson – executive producer 
 Andrew D. Prickett – producer, engineer, mixing 
 Kevin Max – co-producer, mixing 
 Elijah Thomson – engineer 
 Chris Colbert – mixing
 Mark Rodriguez – mastering at Vision Mastering (Stanton, California)
 Lance Alton Troxel – art direction, design 
 Melinda DiMauro – photography

References

External links
Kevin Max official website
Northern Records official website
http://www.theimpostermovie.com/

Kevin Max albums
2005 albums